William Beale (1784–1854) was an English composer and baritone.

William Beale may also refer to:

William Beale (college head) (died 1651), English academic and Royalist
Sir William Beale, 1st Baronet (1839–1922), British barrister and politician
William H. Beale (1920–1962), US Army Air Forces officer and CIA agent
William Beale (priest) (died 1651), Archdeacon of Carmarthen

See also
William Beal (disambiguation)
Beale (surname)